The franc (unofficially MCF) was the official currency of the Principality of Monaco until 1995 (de facto, 1996 de jure), when it changed to the French franc. The franc was subdivided into 100 centimes or 10 décimes. The Monégasque franc circulated alongside the French franc with the same value. Like the French franc, the Monégasque franc was revalued in 1960 at a rate of 100 old francs = 1 new franc. The official euro-to-franc exchange rate was MCF 6.55957 to EUR 1.

Today, Monégasque coins have only numismatic value, including the fleurs de coins, or proof-like coins. The period for exchange of the coins for euros has expired.

The Monégasque franc was legal tender in Monaco, France and Andorra.

Coins
Monaco's first decimal coins were issued in 1837 and 1838, in denominations of 5 centimes, 1 decime and 5 francs. The 5 centimes and 1 decime were minted in both copper and brass and were the same size as the earlier French coins (France was not minting these denominations at the time) whilst the 5 francs matched the French coin. No further issues were made until 1882, from when gold 100 franc coins were issued until 1904.

Between 1924 and 1926, aluminium-bronze 50 centimes, 1 and 2 francs were issued of the same size as the French coins. In 1943, aluminium 1 and 2 francs were introduced followed by aluminium-bronze versions in 1945, alongside aluminium 5 francs. In 1946, cupronickel 10 francs were introduced, followed by 20 francs in 1947, a coin to which there was no corresponding French coin. In 1950, aluminium-bronze 10, 20 and 50 francs and cupro-nickel 100 francs were issued, with the size of the 100 francs reduced to match the French coin in 1956.

When the franc was revalued in 1960, Monaco issued nickel 1 franc and silver 5 franc coins. In 1962, aluminium-bronze 10, 20, and 50 centime coins were added, followed by nickel  franc coins in 1965, nickel-clad cupronickel 5 francs in 1971, nickel-brass 10 francs in 1974, stainless steel 1 centime and aluminium-bronze 5 centimes in 1976, bi-metallic 10 francs in 1989, and tri-metallic 20 francs 1992, respectively. All of these coins matched the sizes and compositions of corresponding French coins.

Banknotes
The only Monégasque banknotes are dated 20 MARS 1920. There was an initial emergency issuance of 25 and 50 centime and 1 franc notes on 28 April 1920, followed by a second issued of 25 centime and 1 franc notes with different color schemes. The violet 25 centime notes are available with and without embossing, which was used to validate the notes, but the process was soon discontinued as a cost-cutting measure. The embossed notes have a crowned shield with diamond pattern at center, encircled by the text Principauté de Monaco, and are available with circles of two different diameters.

See also
 Monégasque euro coins

References

External links
Non Fungible Tokens

1995 disestablishments in Europe
Currencies of Europe
Currencies of Monaco
History of Monaco
Modern obsolete currencies
Currencies replaced by the euro
France–Monaco relations
1837 establishments in Europe